AWHF may refer to:

Alaska Women's Hall of Fame
Australian Women's History Forum